Nyctimantis siemersi, commonly known as red-spotted Argentina frog, is a species of frog in the family Hylidae. 
It is found in the catchment of Paraná River in Argentina and Paraguay, and in the southern coast of Uruguay.

There are two subspecies that might be distinct species: Nyctimantis siemersi siemersi and Nyctimantis siemersi pederseni Williams and Bosso, 1994. A. s. pederseni occurs in leaf axils of terrestrial Aechmea bromeliads in gallery forests along main river systems. It reproduces in temporary pools close to the bromeliads. The nominal subspecies occurs and reproduces in wetlands and the delta of Río Paraná. This rare frog is threatened by habitat loss.

References 

Hylidae
Amphibians described in 1937
Amphibians of Argentina
Amphibians of Paraguay
Amphibians of Uruguay
Taxa named by Robert Mertens
Taxonomy articles created by Polbot
Monotypic amphibian genera